Comet Ikeya–Zhang (Japanese, Chinese: 池谷-張彗星, officially designated 153P/Ikeya–Zhang) is a comet discovered independently by two astronomers from Japan and China in 2002. It has by far the longest orbital period of the numbered periodic comets.

On February 1, 2002, Chinese astronomer Zhang Daqing from Kaifeng discovered a new comet in the constellation Cetus, and reported it to the IAU. He found that Japanese astronomer Kaoru Ikeya had discovered it earlier than he had, as the time of sunset is earlier than China. According to tradition, since they discovered the new comet independently, the comet was named after both of them. The comet was initially designated as C/2002 C1 (Ikeya–Zhang).

The comet was observed in 1661, 341 years earlier, by Polish astronomer Johannes Hevelius. A bright comet had also been recorded by Chinese astronomers in 1661.

The permanent designation "153P" was given to the comet. It has the longest known orbital period of any periodic comet (366.51 years). Its orbital speed around the Sun varies from 59 km/s at perihelion to 0.29 km/s at aphelion.

The comet passed perihelion on March 18, 2002, and with apparent magnitude 2.9. With a multi-hundred year orbit involving asymmetric outgassing the next perihelion passage is expected between 2362–2363. During March–April 2002, protons from the comet tail may have been detected by the Cassini spacecraft.

See also 
 Johannes Hevelius
 List of Solar System objects by greatest aphelion

Notes

References 
 

 Cometography.com: 153P/Ikeya–Zhang

External links
Orbital simulation from JPL (Java) / Horizons Ephemeris
 153P/Ikeya–Zhang (2002)

Periodic comets
0153